The 1991 Virginia Slims of Houston was a women's tennis tournament played on outdoor clay courts at the Westside Tennis Club in Houston, Texas in the United States that was part of Tier II of the 1991 WTA Tour. It was the 21st edition of the tournament and was held from April 15 through April 21, 1991. First-seeded Monica Seles won the singles title and earned $70,000 first-prize money.

Finals

Singles
 Monica Seles defeated  Mary Joe Fernández 6–4, 6–3
 It was Seles' 3rd singles title of the year and the 13th of her career.

Doubles
 Jill Hetherington /  Kathy Rinaldi defeated  Patty Fendick /  Mary Joe Fernández 6–1, 2–6, 6–1

External links
 ITF tournament edition details
 Tournament draws

Virginia Slims of Houston
Virginia Slims of Houston
Virginia Slims of Houston
Virginia Slims of Houston
Virginia Slims of Houston
Virginia Slims of Houston